Cosmic Research (Russian: Kosmicheskie Issledovaniya) is a bimonthly peer-reviewed scientific journal that was established in 1963. It is published by MAIK Nauka/Interperiodica and published online by Springer Science+Business Media. The editor-in-chief is Anatoli A. Petrukovich (Space Research Institute, Russian Academy of Sciences, Moscow, Russia). The journal is a continuation of the Soviet-Russian publication Artificial Earth Satellites, in existence between 1960–1964.

Scope 
The journal covers research in space science and related space technologies. Subject coverage includes cosmic physics, astronautics in geophysics, and astronautics in general.

Abstracting and indexing 
This journal is abstracted and indexed in Science Citation Index Expanded, Current Contents/Physical, Chemical & Earth Sciences, Academic OneFile, Academic Search, Astrophysics Data System, Chemical Abstracts Service, INIS Atomindex, Inspec, and Scopus. According to the Journal Citation Reports, the journal has a 2020 impact factor of 0.419.

References

External links 
 

Space science journals
English-language journals
Publications established in 1963
Bimonthly journals
Springer Science+Business Media academic journals
Nauka academic journals